Direct action  originated as a political activist term for economic and political acts in which the actors use their power (e.g. economic or physical) to directly reach certain goals of interest, in contrast to those actions that appeal to others (e.g. authorities), by, for example, revealing an existing problem, highlighting an alternative, or demonstrating a possible solution.

Both direct action and actions appealing to others can include nonviolent and violent activities that target persons, groups, or property deemed offensive to the action participants. Nonviolent direct action may include sit-ins, strikes, and counter-economics. Violent direct action may include political violence, assault, arson, sabotage, and property destruction.

By contrast, electoral politics, diplomacy, negotiation, and arbitration are not usually described as direct action since they are electorally mediated. Nonviolent actions are sometimes a form of civil disobedience and may involve a degree of intentional law-breaking where persons place themselves in arrestable situations in order to make a political statement, but other actions (such as strikes) may not violate criminal law.

The aim of direct action is to either obstruct another political agent or political organization from performing some practice to which the activists object or to solve perceived problems that traditional societal institutions (governments, religious organizations, or established trade unions) are not addressing to the satisfaction of the direct action participants.

Nonviolent direct action has historically been an assertive regular feature of the tactics employed by social movements, including Mahatma Gandhi's Indian Independence Movement and the King/Bevel-led Civil Rights Movement. Anarchists organize almost exclusively through direct action, which manifests as a varied set of actions, nonviolent or violent. Direct action is used by anarchists due to a rejection of party politics and refusal to work within hierarchical bureaucratic institutions.

History

Direct action tactics have been around for as long as conflicts have existed but it is not known when the term first appeared. José Ortega y Gasset located the origins of the term and concept of direct action in fin-de-siècle France: "When the reconstruction of the origins of our epoch is undertaken, it will be observed that the first notes of its special harmony were sounded in those groups of French syndicalists and realists of about 1900, inventors of the method and the name of 'direct action.'" The radical union the Industrial Workers of the World first mentioned the term "direct action" in a publication in reference to a Chicago strike conducted in 1910.  Other noted historical practitioners of direct action include the American Civil Rights Movement, the Global Justice Movement,  the Suffragettes, LGBT and other human rights movements (e.g. ACT UP); revolutionary Che Guevara, and certain environmental advocacy groups.

American anarchist Voltairine de Cleyre wrote an essay called "Direct Action" in 1912 which is widely cited today. In this essay, de Cleyre points to historical examples such as the Boston Tea Party and the American anti-slavery movement, noting that "direct action has always been used, and has the historical sanction of the very people now reprobating it."

In his 1920 book, Direct Action, William Mellor placed direct action firmly in the struggle between worker and employer for control "over the economic life of society."  Mellor defined direct action "as the use of some form of economic power for securing of ends desired by those who possess that power." Mellor considered direct action a tool of both owners and workers and for this reason, he included within his definition lockouts and cartels, as well as strikes and sabotage.

Martin Luther King Jr. felt that the goal of nonviolent direct action was to "create such a crisis and foster such a tension" as to demand a response.
The rhetoric of King, James Bevel, and Mahatma Gandhi promoted nonviolent direct action as a means to social change. Gandhi and Bevel had been strongly influenced by Leo Tolstoy's 1894 book The Kingdom of God Is Within You, which is considered a classic text that ideologically promotes passive resistance.

By the middle of the 20th century, the sphere of direct action had undoubtedly expanded, though the meaning of the term had perhaps contracted.  Many campaigns for social change—such as those seeking suffrage, improved working conditions, civil rights, abortion rights or an end to abortion, an end to gentrification, and environmental protection—claim to employ at least some types of violent or nonviolent direct action.

Some sections of the anti-nuclear movement used direct action, particularly during the 1980s. Groups opposing the introduction of cruise missiles into the United Kingdom employed tactics such as breaking into and occupying United States air bases, and blocking roads to prevent the movement of military convoys and disrupt military projects.

Environmental movement organizations such as Greenpeace have used direct action to pressure governments and companies to change environmental policies for years. On April 28, 2009, Greenpeace activists, including Phil Radford, scaled a crane across the street from the Department of State, calling on world leaders to address climate change. Soon thereafter, Greenpeace activists dropped a banner off of Mount Rushmore, placing President Obama's face next to other historic presidents, which read "History Honors Leaders; Stop Global Warming".

In 2009, hundreds blocked the gates of the coal fired power plant that powers the US Congress building, following the Power Shift conference in Washington, D.C. In attendance at the Capitol Climate Action were Bill McKibben, Terry Tempest Williams, Phil Radford, Wendell Berry, Robert Kennedy Junior, Judy Bonds and many more prominent figures of the climate justice movement were in attendance.

Anti-abortion groups in the United States, particularly Operation Rescue, often used nonviolent sit-ins at the entrances of abortion clinics as a form of direct action in the late 1980s and early 1990s.

Anti-globalization activists made headlines around the world in 1999, when they forced the Seattle WTO Ministerial Conference of 1999 to end early with direct action tactics and prefigurative politics. The goal that they had, shutting down the meetings, was directly accomplished by placing their bodies and other debris between the WTO delegates and the building they were meant to meet in.  Activists also engaged in property destruction as a direct way of stating their opposition to corporate culture—this can be viewed as a direct action if the goal was to shut down those stores for a period of time, or an indirect action if the goal was influencing corporate policy.

Direct action has also been used on a smaller scale. Refugee Salim Rambo was saved from being deported from the UK back to the Democratic Republic of the Congo when one person stood up on his flight and refused to sit down.  After a two-hour delay the man was arrested, but the pilot refused to fly with Rambo on board. Salim Rambo was ultimately released from state custody and remains free today.

In the 1980s, a California direct action protest group called Livermore Action Group called its newspaper Direct Action. The paper ran for 25 issues, and covered hundreds of nonviolent actions around the world. The book Direct Action: An Historical Novel took its name from this paper, and records dozens of actions in the San Francisco Bay Area.

Human rights activists have used direct action in the ongoing campaign to close the School of the Americas, renamed in 2001 the Western Hemisphere Institute for Security Cooperation. As a result, 245 SOA Watch human rights defenders have collectively spent almost 100 years in prison. More than 50 people have served probation sentences.

"Direct Action" has also served as the moniker of at least two groups: the French Action Directe as well as the Canadian group more popularly known as the Squamish Five. Direct Action is also the name of the magazine of the Australian Wobblies. The UK's Solidarity Federation currently publishes a magazine called Direct Action.

Until 1990, Australia's Socialist Workers Party published a party paper also named "Direct Action", in honour of the Wobblies' history. One of the group's descendants, the Revolutionary Socialist Party, has again started a publication of this name.

Food Not Bombs is often described as direct action because individuals involved directly act to solve a social problem; people are hungry and yet there is food available. Food Not Bombs is inherently dedicated to nonviolence.

A museum that chronicles the history of direct action and grassroots activism in the Lower East Side of New York City, the Museum of Reclaimed Urban Space, opened in 2012.

In the United States, direct action is increasingly used as a tool to oppose oil drilling, pipeline, and gas power plant projects and against the influence of the fossil fuel industry.

Preparation 
Literature underlines the necessity of preparing direct actions. Essential is scouting and knowledge of the area actions shall happen. People involved in direct actions shall practice active listening and mental recall techniqes and teach their instincts. Inside a group of activists action names and encryption are considered to be useful. Good knowledge of the groups participants, their lifestyle, financial situation and family can reduce risks.

Good knowledge of the legal situation is recommended. Big direct action groups form "legal teams", taking care for interactions with the judicative and investigative branches.

Calmnesss considered to be the key for any action. Good shoes, water, some food, gloves,lights, raingear, first aid, sun protection communication devices, a well trained buddy or group, meeting points, plastic bags, avoiding rings and jewelry, facecover and a contact to a lawyer or people of the legal team will improve the actions results.

For certain actions specific roles are useful like; press-contact,police liaision,deescalation, climbers, blockers, distractors, scouts.

Some groups like "Ende Gelände" love to wear the same, white, suits during an action.

Nonviolent direct action 

Other terms for nonviolent direct action include civil resistance, people power, satyagraha, nonviolent resistance, and positive action.

Examples of nonviolent direct action include sit-ins, tree sitting, strikes, workplace occupations, street blockades, hacktivism, counter-economics and tax resistance.

Martin Luther King Jr. advised that before taking steps of direct action that you first ensure there is an issue, educate others about the issue, negotiate with your opponent in a way to elicit their cooperation rather than turning them into an enemy, and then take direct action if no change is forthcoming. His proposed direct actions included boycotts and sit-ins.

Mahatma Gandhi called his methods Satyagraha. They did not involve any direct confrontation and could be described as 'removal of support' without breaking of "other laws" besides those explicitly targeted (like the salt laws by the Salt March or, e. g., Transvaal's Asiatic Law Amendment Ordinance and Asiatic Registration Act by specifically boycotting their application). Largely symbolic and peaceful, his preferred actions might include "withdrawing membership, participation or attendance in government-operated schools, courts, and all official agencies."

George Lakey, who has been involved in nonviolent direct action for over six decades, has written numerous books on the subject. His basics include "realisable goals, nonviolent protests, targeted campaigns, and remaining true to your values". In 2018 he updated his 1965 book A Manual for Direct Action into How We Win: A Guide to Nonviolent Direct Action Campaigning. In a 2019 interview Lakey said "I just was so driven by not only a heart that said killing another person is just plain, fundamentally wrong, but also the pragmatic arguments that came about from the extraordinary successes that I found in history when people boldly tried nonviolence and it worked."

Greenpeace loves to install banners in trees or at symbolic places like offices, statues, nuclear power plants.

blockades: 

 body block
 linking arms
 sitting arms under legs
 lock-ons
 tunneling
 aerial
 treesit
 occupation

pranks 

 "flower delivery"
 pieing
 citizen arrest
 turning off gas/lights/water
 highway sign improvement
 stink bombs
 critter bombs
 paint bombs
 debris piles
 pebbles
 closing doors
 guerilla theater
 balloon banners

Violent direct action 

Violent direct action is any direct action which utilizes physical injurious force against persons or, occasionally, property. Examples of violent direct action include: rioting, lynching, terrorism, political assassination, freeing political prisoners, interfering with police actions, and armed insurrection.

Insurrectionary anarchism a militant variant of anarchist ideology primarily deals with direct action against governments, as insurrectionist anarchists see countries as being inherently controlled by the upper classes, and thereby being impossible to reform. Insurrectionalists take violent action against the state, and other targets. Most insurrectionists anarchists largely reject mass grassroots organizations created by other anarchists, instead insurrectionists call for coordinated militant action to be taken by decentralized cell networks. Insurrectionists call for constant class conflict against the rich and upper classes. Insurrectionists unlike other anarchists call for the creation of anarchist mass societies through the seizing and invasion of land from the state, such as EZLN or Rojava. Insurrectionists have engaged in mass protests and direct action against the state, from Russia, to the United States. As opposed to other anarchists who call for cooperatives and small societies to be formed within communities internally. Despite this the vast majority of anarchists are not militant and do not engage in militant actions.

Ann Hansen, one of the Squamish 5, also known as Vancouver 5, a Canadian anarchist and self-professed urban guerrilla fighter, wrote in her book Direct Action that,

Fascism emphasizes direct action, including supporting the legitimacy of political violence, as a core part of its politics.

Destruction of property 

Destruction of property might include vandalism, theft, breaking and entering, sabotage, tree spiking, arson, bombing, ecotage, or eco-terrorism.

Arson, ordinarily considered a property crime, is usually categorized by law as a violent crime.

Sociologist Dieter Rucht states that determining if an act is violent falls along a spectrum or gradient, with lesser property damage clearly not violence, injuries to humans are clearly violent, and acts in between could be labelled either way depending on the circumstances. He states that definitions of "violence" vary widely, and cultural perspectives can also color such a label. However, he states a basic 1969 definition of violence is preferable: "Violence means intentionally caused or carelessly accepted damage to/destruction of property or the injuring/killing of people".

Some activist groups such as Earth Liberation Front and Animal Liberation Front use direct action which includes property destruction, arson and sabotage. They claim their acts are nonviolent, and assert that violence is harm directed towards living things and not property.

Direct action involving property destruction becomes classified as "violent" when it crosses the "threshold of violence" from basic property crime over into the category of terrorism. In the US, "Domestic terrorism is the unlawful use, or threatened use, of violence by a group or individual ... committed against persons or property to intimidate or coerce a government, the civilian population, or any segment thereof, in furtherance of political or social objectives."

See also 

 List of civil rights leaders
 List of direct action groups
 List of peace activists
 Protest
 Praxis (process)
 Rebellion
 Revolution
 Vigilantism

References

Bibliography

Further reading

 Hauser, Luke (2003) Direct Action: An Historical Novel. Available at www.directaction.org.
 Lunori, G. (1999) Direct Action.  Available at sniggle.net.
 Kauffman, L.A. (2017) "Direct Action: Protest and the Reinvention of American Radicalism".  New York, Verso, 2017.  
 Sparrow, R. (undated) Anarchist Politics and Direct Action. Available at Spunk Online Anarchist Library.
 A Communiqué on Tactics and Organization to the Black Bloc, from within the Black Bloc, by The Green Mountain Anarchist Collective (NEFAC-VT) & Columbus Anti-Racist Action, Black Clover Press, 2001.
 The Black Bloc Papers: An Anthology of Primary Texts From The North American Anarchist Black Bloc 1988–2005, by Xavier Massot & David Van Deusen of the Green Mountain Anarchist Collective (NEFAC-VT), Breaking Glass Press, 2010.
 Hansen, Ann. Direct Action: Memoirs of an Urban Guerrilla. Toronto: Between the Lines, 2001. 
 Van Deusen On North American Black Blocs 1996–2001, by David Van Deusen, The Anarchist Library, 2017.

 
Activism by type
Autonomism
Far-left politics
Industrial Workers of the World culture
Protest tactics